Ethmia okinawana is a moth in the family Depressariidae. It is found in Japan and Taiwan.

References

Moths described in 1931
okinawana